Hezekiah Barnard   was an American politician who served as a member of the Massachusetts House of Representatives  and as the Treasurer and Receiver-General of Massachusetts.

Notes

Members of the Massachusetts House of Representatives
State treasurers of Massachusetts
People from Nantucket, Massachusetts